The 1995–96 Idaho Vandals men's basketball team represented the University of Idaho during the 1995–96 NCAA Division I men's basketball season. Members of the Big Sky Conference, the Vandals were led by third-year head coach Joe Cravens and played their home games on campus at the Kibbie Dome in Moscow, Idaho.

Idaho incurred consecutive losing seasons for the first time in a decade, when they had three straight cellar finishes under Bill Trumbo. A few days later, Cravens was fired by athletic director Pete Liske, and was succeeded by former head coach 

After this season, Idaho (and Boise State) departed for the Big West Conference; Vandal basketball later returned to the Big Sky, beginning with the 2014–15 season.

Postseason results

|-
!colspan=6 style=| Big Sky tournament

References

External links
Sports Reference – Idaho Vandals: 1995–96 basketball season
Gem of the Mountains: 1996 University of Idaho yearbook – 1995–96 basketball season
Idaho Argonaut – student newspaper – 1996 editions

Idaho Vandals men's basketball seasons
Idaho
Idaho
Idaho